Galician Unity (UG) was a Galician nationalist and social democratic political coalition formed by the Galician Workers Party, Galician Socialist Party, and the Galicianist Party in 1979.

History
The coalition aimed at promoting a degree of autonomy and self-governance of Galicia from Spain equal to that of Catalonia and the Basque Country, other autonomous communities of Spain. The coalition also promoted the adoption of a statute of autonomy for Galicia (like the 1978 Statute of Autonomy of the Basque Country and the 1979 Statute of Autonomy of Catalonia). This goal was achieved with the Galician Statute of Autonomy of 1981.

UG obtained more than 58,000 votes in the 1979 Spanish general election, but failed to gain any parliamentary representation in the Cortes Generales. In the municipal elections of 1979, UG candidate Domingos Merino was elected mayor of A Coruña, the second largest city of Galicia. UG candidates were also elected mayors in Cambados, Narón, Rairiz de Veiga, Redondela, As Pontes de García Rodríguez, Touro, Vilaboa and Malpica de Bergantiños.

Galician Unity was partially absorbed into the Bloque Nacionalista Galego in 1982.

Elections

References

Miguel Anxo Fernández Baz, A formación do nacionalismo galego contemporáneo (1963–1984), Santiago de Compostela, 2003.

1979 establishments in Spain
1980 disestablishments in Spain
Defunct nationalist parties in Spain
Defunct political party alliances in Spain
Defunct social democratic parties in Spain
Defunct socialist parties in Galicia (Spain)
Galician nationalist parties
Left-wing nationalist parties
Political parties disestablished in 1980
Political parties established in 1979
Secessionist organizations in Europe